"Shake It Up" is a song by English rock band Bad Company. The song was released as the lead single from the band's eighth studio album, Dangerous Age. Written by vocalist Brian Howe and producer Terry Thomas, the song fared much better than previous single "Fame and Fortune", which only peaked at #37 on the Billboard Mainstream Rock chart. "Shake It Up" was a top-10 hit on the chart, helping to re-establish the band's fame.

Track listing
7" single

Promo CD single

Charts

Personnel
Bad Company
 Brian Howe – lead vocals
 Mick Ralphs – guitar
 Steve Price – bass
 Simon Kirke – drums

Additional
 Terry Thomas – production, backing vocals

References

Bad Company songs
1988 songs
1988 singles
Atlantic Records singles
Songs written by Brian Howe (singer)